SuperDeluxe is a restaurant chain based in Portland, Oregon. There are three restaurants in the Portland metropolitan area, including the original in southeast Portland, another in northwest Portland's Pearl District, and a third in Sherwood, Oregon. In 2022, a fourth location opened in Bend.

Description

The restaurant serves burgers, chicken nuggets, French fries, and milkshakes. Burgers are served with American cheese, onions, pickles, and shredded lettuce. The breakfast menu includes tot hash browns. The drink menu offers coffee (including almond milk lattes and mochas), using Stumptown Coffee Roasters. Milkshake flavors include blackberry, chocolate, coffee, strawberry, and vanilla.

Willamette Week Andi Prewitt said of the original restaurant: "The building has been made over with bright, primary colors and a graphics motif that seems to pay homage to minimalist corporate designs from the '70s."

History

The original restaurant is located in southeast Portland's Richmond neighborhood, near the intersection of 50th Avenue, Foster Road, and Powell Boulevard. Co-owners Micah Camden and Matt Lynch opened the drive-through in July 2018, in a building which previously housed a TacoTime restaurant. In 2019, Lynch confirmed plans for a second restaurant in northwest Portland's Pearl District. A third restaurant opened in Sherwood, Oregon, in 2020. A fourth opened in Bend in 2022.

The company's logo was designed by Portland-based graphic designer Aaron James Draplin.

Reception
In 2018, David Landsel of Food & Wine wrote, "the vibe at SuperDeluxe feels more San Fernando Valley than Pacific Northwest, all hot asphalt and thumping bass and exhaust smells, except that the strip club facing the restaurant parking lot, overflowing with cars trying to get into the drive-thru, sports a cheeky sign, advertising 'gluten-free lap dances. Bill Oakley called the burger "the best burger [he's] ever had in Portland". He named SuperDeluxe one of the best Portland-based fast food chains in his 2021 "guide to dining in Portland". Portland Monthly writers ranked the Double Deluxe number 12 on a 2020 list of "Portland’s 20 Best Cheeseburgers". Naomi Tomky included SuperDeluxe in Thrillist's 2021 list of "15 Pacific Northwest Fast Food Chains the Entire Country Needs".

See also
 List of fast food restaurant chains

References

External links

 

2018 establishments in Oregon
Fast-food chains of the United States
Fast-food hamburger restaurants
Pearl District, Portland, Oregon
Restaurants established in 2018
Restaurants in Bend, Oregon
Restaurants in Portland, Oregon
Sherwood, Oregon